Vernon is an unincorporated community and census-designated place (CDP) in Apache County, Arizona, United States. As of the 2010 census it had a population of 122. Vernon has a post office with ZIP code 85940.

Vernon was settled by B.H. Wilhelm Jr, who named it in 1894 for William Tecumseh Vernon. It was important at first as a sawmill town, but as activity diminished, people moved away. It had been a Mormon ward, but they disbanded it in 1954, when the sawmill business finally moved to the vicinity of Lakeside.

It is east of Show Low.

Demographics

During recent years Vernon has grown little. Some ranches have been active since 1870. The Romyak Compound incorporated in 2014, know locally as "Ranchero Vidrio Vista".

Education
Its local school district is the Vernon Elementary School District.

References

External links
 Vernon – ghosttowns.com

Ghost towns in Arizona
Census-designated places in Apache County, Arizona